Peng Shuai was the defending champion, but withdrew before the tournament began.

Wang Qiang won her first WTA Tour singles title, defeating Zheng Saisai in the final, 7–5, 4–0 ret.

Seeds

Draw

Finals

Top half

Bottom half

Qualifying

Seeds

Qualifiers

Lucky losers

Draw

First qualifier

Second qualifier

Third qualifier

Fourth qualifier

Fifth qualifier

Sixth qualifier

References
Main Draw
Qualifying Draw

Jiangxi International Women's Tennis Open - Women's Singles
2018 Women's Singles